Amomyrtella irregularis (formerly Myrcianthes irregularis) is a species of tree in the myrtle family, Myrtaceae. It is endemic to Ecuador, where it grows in the humid forests of the southern Andes. Its common name is mate-mate.

References

Myrtaceae
Endemic flora of Ecuador
Endangered plants
Taxonomy articles created by Polbot
Taxobox binomials not recognized by IUCN